De Gea is a surname. Notable people with the surname include:

 David de Gea (born 1990), Spanish footballer who plays as a goalkeeper for Manchester United 
 José David de Gea, Spanish Grand Prix motorcycle racer
 Nicolas de Géa (born 1983), French footballer

See also
 Gea de Albarracín, a municipality located in Aragon, Spain